Robert “Rob” Weisberg (born 1950 in Hagerstown, Maryland) was the American Ambassador to the Republic of the Congo from March 21, 2006, until March 2, 2008.

Early life and education
He graduated from Haverford College, the University of North Carolina School of Law, and the National War College and is a member of the bar in New Hampshire and New York.

Career
While at the US Embassy in Moscow between 1984 and 1986, Weisberg "was an active participant in the Mission's outreach to Soviet dissidents and Soviet Jews who had been refused exit visas."

He oversaw the opening of the American Embassy in Dili, East Timor, from 2000 until 2002.

Before entering the Foreign Service, Weisberg was a development officer at Dartmouth College.

References

 

1950 births
Ambassadors of the United States to the Republic of the Congo
Haverford College alumni
National War College alumni
University of North Carolina School of Law alumni
Dartmouth College people
Living people